Alfred Richard Carapella (April 26, 1927 – October 17, 2020) was an American and Canadian football defensive tackle who played for the San Francisco 49ers and Hamilton Tiger-Cats.

Early life and education
Carapella was born on April 26, 1927 in Tuckahoe, New York. During the Depression, Carapella lived with his three siblings in a cold water flat in Tuckahoe. While attending Tuckahoe High School, he lettered in football and baseball, excelling at both. Carapella was named to Westchester County's All-County football team in 1942, and he helped Tuckahoe High's baseball team win conference championships in 1943 and 1944.

After his junior year, Carapella had his older brother sign a waiver to allow him to try out for the New York Giants baseball club. After a tryout at the Polo Grounds, the Giants signed Carapella to a minor league contract. He was assigned to the Richmond Colts, then moved to the Erie Sailors. Because he signed a professional contract, Carapella was ineligible to compete in high school athletics during his senior year.

U.S. Army
Upon graduating from Tuckahoe High School in 1945, Carapella was drafted into the United States Army. Carapella was deployed to Germany, where he played football with the Berlin Bears, an interservice team composed of several college and NFL football players. Upon noticing that he could compete with players of that caliber, Carapella decided to pursue football when he was discharged from the Army. He asked his former high school coach to try to set up some workouts with college programs, and Carapella was invited to try out for the Miami and Kentucky. Carapella garnered scholarship offers from both schools, but his offer letter from Kentucky was addressed to his uncle by mistake, and he was unaware of the offer until after he had enrolled at Miami.

University of Miami
During his first year at Miami, Carapella played on the freshman football team, playing offensive line and fullback. In his senior year, Carapella helped lead the undefeated Hurricanes to an Orange Bowl berth, where they were defeated by Clemson by a score of 15-14 after Miami surrendered a late safety.

Carapella died on October 17, 2020, in Tuckahoe, New York at age 93.

References

1927 births
2020 deaths
American football defensive linemen
Hamilton Tiger-Cats players
Miami Hurricanes football players
Military personnel from New York (state)
People from Tuckahoe, Westchester County, New York
San Francisco 49ers players
United States Army personnel of World War II
Western Conference Pro Bowl players
Players of American football from New York (state)